The Lady Takes a Flyer is a 1958 American CinemaScope Eastmancolor comedy-drama romance film released by Universal Pictures. It was directed by Jack Arnold and written by Danny Arnold based on a story by Edmund H. North.

Plot

Daredevil pilot Mike Dandridge enters into a business partnership with flight-school pal Al Reynolds and meets Maggie Colby, who is also a pilot.

The two flyers take cargo to Japan, where they become romantically involved. Al is best man at their wedding, then joins the Air Force.

Mike hires new pilot Nikki Taylor and might be having an affair with her during business trips while Maggie stays home with their new baby. Maggie flies a shipment herself and lets Mike care of their daughter. He and copilot Phil take a risk by bringing the baby along on a flight to London. Their plane has difficulty landing in fog, angering Maggie, whose own plane barely landed safely. However, Mike and Maggie are brought closer by the experience.

Cast

 Lana Turner as Maggie Colby 
 Jeff Chandler as Mike Dandridge 
 Richard Denning as  Al Reynolds 
 Andra Martin as  Nikki Taylor 
 Chuck Connors as  Phil Donahoe 
 Reta Shaw as  Nurse Kennedy 
 Alan Hale Jr. as  Frank Henshaw
 Jerry Paris as Willie Ridgeley
 Dee J. Thompson as Collie Minor
 Nestor Paiva as Childreth
 James Doherty as Tower Operator

Production
The film was based on an original screenplay, originally known as Pilots for Hire, then Lion in the Sky. The film was also known as Wild and Wonderful. It was the first of a two-picture deal that Turner had signed with Universal.

Filming began in April 1957.

A novelization of the screenplay, illustrated with production stills, was written by American writer Edward S. Aarons under the pseudonym Edward Ronns.

Reception
Variety magazine said "Teaming of Lana Turner and Jeff Chandler figure .to help the chances of this peacetime air yarn, which: otherwise falls short of satisfactory entertainment. . Film is 
burdened with plodding treatment that militates against ready acceptance, but star names-— particularly femme’s firepower after her performance in Peyton Place -— coupled with a spicy bathtub sequence may. be exploited for fair returns in general market."

References

External links

1958 films
1950s romantic comedy-drama films
American aviation films
American romantic comedy-drama films
1950s English-language films
Films directed by Jack Arnold
Films scored by Herman Stein
Universal Pictures films
1958 comedy films
1958 drama films
Films set in Japan
Japan in non-Japanese culture
1950s American films